Ulmus 'Exoniensis', the Exeter elm, was discovered near Exeter, England, in 1826, and propagated by the Ford & Please nursery in that city. Traditionally believed to be a cultivar of the Wych Elm U. glabra, its fastigiate shape when young, upward-curving tracery, small samarae and leaves, late leaf-flush and late leaf-fall, taken with its south-west England provenance, suggest a link with the Cornish Elm, which shares these characteristics.

Description
The tree initially has an upright, columnar form, but later develops a large rounded crown and occasionally reaches 17 m in height. Older specimens may develop pendulous branches. Exeter Elm is chiefly distinguished by its contorted leaves, < 11 cm long by 8 cm broad, rounder than the type [wych] and with more laciniate margins, which occasionally wrap around the branchlets and remain thus well into winter. 'Exoniensis' is often pollarded to produce a denser, fan-shaped crown (see main picture).

Pests and diseases
Chevalier noted (1942) that Ulmus montana fastigiata (Exeter Elm) was one of four European cultivars found by researchers in The Netherlands to have significant resistance to the earlier strain of Dutch elm disease prevalent in the 1920s and '30s, the others being 'Monumentalis' Rinz, 'Berardii' and 'Vegeta'. The four were rated less resistant than U. foliacea clone 23, from Spain, later cultivated as U. minor 'Christine Buisman'. 'Exoniensis' possesses a moderate resistance to the more virulent strain of Dutch elm disease, and consequently often featured in the Dutch elm breeding programme in association with the Field Elm (U. minor) and Himalayan Elm (U. wallichiana).

Cultivation
Once commonly planted in the UK and parts of western Europe, 'Exoniensis' is also known to have been marketed in Poland in the 19th century by the Ulrich nursery, Warsaw, and remains in commerce there. The Späth nursery of Berlin cultivated the tree as U. montana fastigiata (U. exoniensis Hort.) from the early 20th century. It is possible that three trees supplied by the Späth nursery to the Royal Botanic Garden Edinburgh in 1902 as U. montana fastigiata were Exeter Elm, old specimens of which survive in Edinburgh (it was the practice of the Garden to distribute trees about the city). In Sweden 'Exoniensis' is sometimes pruned from an early age to form a tidy cone-shaped tree called locally 'pyramidalm' (: pyramid elm - also one of Späth's names for 'Exoniensis'). It is found in Australia at the Ballarat Botanical Gardens where it is listed on the Significant Tree Register of the National Trust. An Ulmus plumosa (a synonym of 'Exoniensis' in continental Europe), of "elegant and pyramidal shape" and "dark green foliage", appeared in the 1902 catalogue of the Bobbink and Atkins nursery, Rutherford, New Jersey.

Notable trees
Bean (1936) noted a large old specimen, 12 feet in girth, in the garden of the Old Vicarage, Bitton, Gloucestershire. A 180-year-old specimen in Hamburg has attained a height of 28 m and a trunk diameter of 1.45 m. The UK TROBI Champion tree is in Scotland, at Baxter Park, Dundee, measuring 15 m high by 103 cm d.b.h. in 2004. The cultivar is represented in Éire by a tree at Birr Castle (Mount Palmer), County Offaly, with a d.b.h. of 29 cm when measured in 2002.

Hybrid cultivars
'Clusius', 'Columella', 'Dodoens', 'Lobel', 'Plantyn', 'Nanguen' = , 'Wanoux' = . The cultivar 'Columella' features the same rough, rounded, contorted leaves, the result of a recessive gene inherited from the Exeter Elm.

'Exoniensis' also indirectly featured in the Italian elm breeding programme as an ancestor of 'Plantyn', which was crossed with clones of the Siberian Elm Ulmus pumila to produce the cultivars 'Arno', 'Plinio', and 'San Zanobi'.

Synonymy

Ulmus campestris var. nuda subvar. fastigiata oxfortii Hort. Vilv., probable misspelling.
Ulmus fordii Hort.: Loudon, Arboretum et Fruticetum Britannicum, 3: 1399, 1838.
: Loudon,  Arboretum et Fruticetum Britannicum, 3: 1399, 1838. 
Ulmus montana f. fastigiata plumosa Hort.: Schelle in Beissner et al. Handbuch der Laubholz-Benennung 85. 1903.
Ulmus ontariensis Hort. ex. Steud.
Ulmus plumosa: C. de Vos ,
Ulmus plumosa foliis variegatis: C. de Vos, Woordenboek 137, 1867. 
Ulmus suberosa oxoniensis: Audibert, Tonelle, Tarascon, France Catalogue, 1832, probable misspelling.
Ulmus ? var. replicata: Masters, Hortus Duroverni, 67, 1831, name in synonymy.

Accessions
Europe
Arboretum Trompenburg , Netherlands. No details available.
Brighton & Hove City Council, UK. NCCPG Elm Collection. A number of trees, large specimens at Stanmer Park Arboretum (1), Linkway Lodge, Hollingdean (40+), University of Sussex (3) and Whitehawk Way (2). 
Cambridge Botanic Garden , University of Cambridge, UK. 1 tree, no accession details available. 
Dubrava Arboretum, Lithuania. No details available.
Grange Farm Arboretum , Sutton St. James, Spalding, Lincs., UK. Acc. no. 829.
Hortus Botanicus Nationalis, Salaspils, Latvia. Acc. nos. 18105,6,7.
Linnaean Gardens of Uppsala, Sweden. Acc. no. 0000–1006.
Museum Castle Sypesteyn, Nieuw-Loosdrechtsedijk 150, Loosdrecht, (Wijdemeren, Netherlands) 3 mature trees planted in 1910.
Royal Botanic Garden Edinburgh, UK. Acc. no. 19699363.
Sir Harold Hillier Gardens, Romsey, UK. Acc. nos. 1977.6756, 1977.7086.
Tallinn Botanic Garden, Estonia . No accession details available.
University of Copenhagen, Botanic Garden, Denmark. No details available.
 Netherlands Plant Collection Ulmus Wijdemeren, 1 tree planted, 2021 Molenmeent Loosdrecht

Australasia
Ballarat Botanical Gardens, Australia. Acc. details not known.

References

External links
  Sheet originally labelled U. montana fastigiata glabra, probably an error for U. montana fastigiata ['Exoniensis'], from Späth nursery, 1902
  Sheet originally labelled U. montana fastigiata glabra, probably an error for U. montana fastigiata ['Exoniensis'], from Späth nursery, 1902

Elm cultivars
Ulmus articles with images
Ulmus